Crop Over is a traditional harvest festival which began in Barbados, having had its early beginnings on the sugar cane plantations during slavery.

History
The original crop-over tradition began in 1687 as a way to mark the end of the yearly harvest, but was wide-spread throughout the region at the time, including in St. Vincent, Trinidad and Jamaica. As such, it still shares similarities with Carnival in Brazil and Trinidad. Many crop-over celebrations were organized and sponsored by planters, who used gifts of food and liquor as a means of reenforcing and excusing the continued enslavement of their labour force. However, slaves would also have often unsanctioned fetes that featured singing, dancing and accompaniment by bottles filled with water, shak-shak, banjo, triangle, fiddle, guitar, and bones that were more in keeping with their ancestral culture. Other traditions that were later added included climbing a greased pole, feasting and drinking competitions. However, with the harsh effects of World War II on Barbados, these annual celebrations came to an end. The Crop Over Festival was first launched on June 1, 1970 around the same time as the birth of Alison Hinds, but was not officially called a festival until 4 years later.

Crop Over was revived and organized as a national festival in 1974 by local stakeholders including Julian Marryshow, Flora Spencer, Emile Straker, and Livvy Burrowes with the Barbados Tourist Board, as a way to attract more tourists to the island and revive interest in local folk culture.  Beginning in June, Crop Over now runs until the first Monday in August when it culminates in the finale, The Grand Kadooment.

Customs and tradition
The entire two months have a party-like atmosphere, with a variety of public and privately held events. The various official 'Events Barbados' festival albums typify the sense of national merriment which is prevalent across the season (see ). The private events serve as the lead up to Kadooment Day and have many concepts such as sunrise, cooler, sunset, and all-inclusive themes. One of the major public features held is the calypso competition. Calypso music, originating in Trinidad, uses syncopated rhythm and topical lyrics which may satirise local politics or comment on the issues of the day. Calypso tents feature a cadre of calypsonians who perform biting social commentaries on the happenings of the past year, political exposés or rousing exhortations to wuk up or "wine up", "jonesing", roll de bumper, guh down (pronounced "dung")  and "six-thirty" dance. Most recently, local variations of soca music have also featured prominently at the festival. There are also craft markets, food tents and stalls, street parties and cavalcades every week supplemented by other daily events. 

Competition 'tents' ring with the fierce battle of calypsonians for the coveted Calypso Monarch Award. There are also the People's Monarch and Party Monarch competitions. The People's Monarch is a competition in which the public are given groups of songs; each group with two songs, and they vote until a winner is chosen. The Party Monarch competition, however, is chosen by a panel of judges and is based on presentation. Therefore, you may have the best song but not be able to make use of stage and props and not be crowned 'Party Monarch King/Queen'. The competition is held on the Ermy Bourne Highway, commonly known as East Coast. The air is redolent with the smells of Barbadian cooking during the Bridgetown Market Street Fair. Rich with the spirit of local culture, the Cohobblopot Festival blends dance and drama and music with the crowning of the King and Queen of costume bands. Every evening the 'Pic-o-de-Crop' Show is performed when finally the King of Calypso is crowned. The climax of the festival is Kadooment Day celebrated with a national holiday when costume bands fill the streets with Barbadian music and fireworks.

2020's Crop Over and National Independence Festival of Creative Arts (NIFCA) were both cancelled due to the coronavirus pandemic.

See also
 List of plantations in Barbados
 List of harvest festivals

Notes

Further notes
The Crop Over Festival: Barbados' Annual Carnival Celebration, by Baz Dreisinger, About.com

External links
 Gallery (Official) Event and Festival photo albums
 Crop Over (Official) website

Barbadian culture
Carnivals in Barbados
Harvest festivals
History of sugar
Food and drink festivals in Barbados
Festivals established in 1688
Music festivals established in 1688
1688 establishments in the British Empire
Music festivals in Barbados
Carnival
Summer events in Barbados
Folk festivals in Barbados